In economics, Reilly's law of retail gravitation is a heuristic developed by William J. Reilly in 1931. According to Reilly's "law," customers are willing to travel longer distances to larger retail centers given the higher attraction they present to customers. In Reilly's formulation, the attractiveness of the retail center becomes the analogy for size (mass) in the physical law of gravity.

The law presumes the geography of the area is flat without any rivers, roads or mountains to alter a consumer's decision of where to travel to buy goods. It also assumes consumers are otherwise indifferent between the actual cities. In analogy with Newton's law of gravitation, the point of indifference is the point at which the "attractiveness" of the two retail centres (postulated to be proportional to their size and inversely proportional to the square of the distance to them) is equal:

 

If the customer is on the line connecting A and B, then if D is the distance between the centres, the point of indifference as measured from A on the line is

 

As expected, for centres of the same size, d=D/2, and if A is larger than B, the point of indifference is closer to B. As the size of A becomes very large with respect to B, d tends to D, meaning the customer will always prefer the larger centre unless they're very close to the smaller one.

Antecedents
In addition to Newton's Law of Gravity in the physical sciences, there were other antecedents to Reilly's "law" of retail gravity. In particular, E.C. Young in 1924 described a formula for migration that was based on the physical law of gravity, and H.C. Carey had included a description of the tendency of humans to "gravitate" together in an 1858 summary of social science theory.

Applications and Later Works
Reilly's law has many variations, and extensions and applications are numerous. Among these include:
 The "Huff" model, which allows for multiple attributes and retail centers;
 Converse's "Breaking Point" formula;
 Batty's generalisation of the breakpoint;

See also
 Demographic gravitation
 Gravity model
 Observations named after people

References

External links
 Reilly's law of retail gravitation

Retail processes and techniques